Alter Kämpfer (German for "Old Fighter"; plural: Alte Kämpfer) is a term referring to the earliest members of the Nazi Party, i.e. those who joined it before the Reichstag 1930 German federal election, with many belonging to the party as early as its first foundation in 1919–1923. Those who joined the party after the electoral breakthrough of September 1930 were known to the Alte Kämpfer as Septemberlings, while those who joined the party after the assumption of power on 30 January 1933 were known as the Märzveilchen. As the party's "Old Guard" and of proven dedication to the movement during its so-called "Period of Struggle" (Kampfzeit) in 1925–1933, they were distinguished from the flood of new members who joined in 1933 and later for opportunistic reasons. A number of special awards/insignia were instituted for this purpose:

 the Honour Chevron for the Old Guard, awarded to those who had joined the party or its affiliated organizations before 30 January 1933;
 the Golden Party Badge, awarded to the first 100,000 members of the party;
 the oldest members, those who had participated in the abortive 1923 Beer Hall Putsch, were further decorated with the Blood Order.

The Alte Kämpfer also enjoyed more tangible benefits of their status. Once the Nazis took power, they received preference in employment and promotion. Many were given prestigious jobs in the opera houses, government buildings and universities of the Third Reich. Many achieved high status, such as Christian Weber, a former bouncer who was made an SS general.

Nazi propaganda glorified them as a small handful of fighters against almost impossible odds.

See also 
 Old Bolshevik

References

Nazi terminology
Nazi Party members